The Sikorsky Firefly is an all-electric helicopter built for research purposes by Sikorsky Aircraft. It has been called the world's "first all-electric helicopter". The Firefly is a modified Sikorsky S-300C helicopter with its engine replaced by an electric motor and two lithium-ion battery packs. The helicopter can hold only the pilot, no passengers, and operate for 12 to 15 minutes.

Sikorsky announced the existence of the new aircraft July 19, 2010 at the Farnborough International Air Show in the United Kingdom and displayed it for the first time at the Experimental Aircraft Association's AirVenture 2010 convention in Oshkosh, Wisconsin on July 26. It was expected that the helicopter would make its first flight in late 2010 or in early 2011. The project was inspired by observing electric drag cars.

Modifications of the Sikorsky S-300C

The Firefly was created by replacing the engine of the S-300C light helicopter, which has been in use for nearly half a century, during which time more than 3,000 have been built. The S-300C's Lycoming , 5.9-liter, 4-cylinder gasoline engine was replaced with an electric motor, new motor mount and two battery packs located on each side of the pilot. The rotor control, transmission and other systems were left essentially unchanged.

If the aircraft completely loses power, it can auto-rotate for a safe landing. The pilot should have plenty of warning if the batteries run down during flight.

Electric engine and battery

The high-efficiency electric motor is powered by two 45Ah lithium-ion battery packs, each of which weighs . The battery packs, manufactured by Gaia Power Technologies, have a total of 300 cells and produce about 370 volts. The electric motor is expected to fly with much less noise, emissions and vibration and require shorter maintenance periods over the life of the aircraft. The electric motor and controller system weighs . Empty weight is close to the  MTOW. The batteries, motor and electronic components are air cooled, and the batteries have 15 minute endurance.

Eagle Aviation Technologies, LLC, installed the new permanent-magnet electric motor and digital controller from U.S. Hybrid, and the batteries.

See also

References

External links

Firefly™ Technology Demonstrator Firefly Sikorsky corporate page (Internet Archive)

Sikorsky Firefly: An Electric Helicopter AvWeb report from Oshkosh EAA AirVenture 2010. Interview with Sikorsky Innovations project manager Jonathan Hartman.

2010s United States helicopters
Firefly
Electric helicopters